Camptoloma is a genus of moths in the family Nolidae. It was formerly incorrectly placed in Arctiidae.

Species
Camptoloma bella M. Wang & G.H. Huang, 2005
Camptoloma binotatum Butler, 1881
Camptoloma carum Kishida, 1984
Camptoloma interiorata (Walker [1865])
Camptoloma kishidai M. Wang & G.H. Huang, 2005
Camptoloma mangpua Zolotuhin & Witt, 2000
Camptoloma mirabilis (Roepke, 1943)
Camptoloma quimeiae Buchsbaum & M.Y. Chen, 2010
Camptoloma tigrinus (Hampson, 1894)
Camptoloma vanata Fang, 1994

References
Natural History Museum Lepidoptera generic names catalog
 Camptoloma at Markku Savela's Lepidoptera and Some Other Life Forms
 , 2010: Camptoloma quimeiae sp. n., a new Camptolominae species from Taiwan (Lepidoptera: Noctuidae). Entomofauna 0031: 49-56.
 , 2005: Two new species of the genus Camptoloma (Lepidoptera: Noctuidae) from China. Florida Entomologist 88 (1): 34-37. Full article: 

Nolidae
Moth genera